Raymond Francis Chappetto (born August 20, 1945) is an American prelate of the Roman Catholic Church who was an auxiliary bishop of the Diocese of Brooklyn in New York City from 2012 to 2022.

Biography

Early life 
Raymond F. Chappetto was born on August 20, 1945, in Astoria, New York.  Chappetto attended Our Lady of Mount Carmel School in Astoria, then entered Cathedral Preparatory Seminary  in Brooklyn for his high school studies. He then attended Cathedral College of the Immaculate Conception in Brooklyn. 

Chappetto earned a Master of Divinity degree from Our Lady of the Angels Seminary in Albany, New York.  He also holds a Master of Religious Studies degree from Saint John's University in New York City.

Priesthood 
Chappetto was ordained a priest for the Diocese of Brooklyn by Bishop Francis Mugavero at the Cathedral Basilica of St. James in Brooklyn on May 29, 1971. After his ordination, Chappetto served as parochial vicar of several parishes in the Borough of Queens in New York City: 

 Saint Camillus in Rockaway Park, 1971 to 1975
 St. Pius V in Jamaica, 1975 to 1976
 Incarnation in Queens Village 1976 to 1981
 St. Helen in Howard Beach  1981 to 1983

Chappetto started his 12-year association with Our Lady of Miracles in Canarsie, Brooklyn, in 1983, first as a member of the team ministry and then as pastor.  In 1995, he left Our Lady of Miracles to become episcopal vicar of Brooklyn West.  In 1999, Chappetto was assigned as pastor of Our Lady of the Snows Parish in North Floral, Queens. While at Our Lady of the Snows, he also served as minister for priests and in 2009 was named vicar for clergy and consecrated life. In 2012, after 13 years at Our Lady of the Snows, Chappetto was transferred to be pastor of St. Kevin's Parish in Flushing, Queens.

Auxiliary Bishop of Brooklyn
Chappetto was appointed titular bishop of Citium and auxiliary bishop of the Diocese of Brooklyn on May 2, 2012, by Pope Benedict XVI. He was consecrated by Bishop Nicholas DiMarzio on July 11, 2012. As auxiliary bishop, Chappetto served as the pastor of St. Kevin Parish in Flushing along with vicar general and vicar for clergy and consecrated life for the diocese

Retirement 
On August 20, 2020, Chappetto reached the mandatory retirement age of 75 and submitted his letter of resignation to Pope Francis, as required by canon law. His resignation was accepted on March 7, 2022.

References

External links
 Roman Catholic Diocese of Brooklyn Official Site

 

}

1945 births
Living people
21st-century American Roman Catholic titular bishops
People from Astoria, Queens